Three former winners of the Tour, François Faber, Octave Lapize and Lucien Petit-Breton had died fighting in World War I. Two other former winners, Philippe Thys and Odile Defraye started the race. The war had been only over for seven months, so most cyclists did not have a chance to train enough for the Tour. For that reason, there were almost no new younger cyclists, and the older cyclists dominated the race.

By starting number

By nationality

References

Cyclists
1919